The North Open, or Abierto del Norte, was one of the major regional golf tournaments in Argentina. First held in 1962, it was always held at the Jockey Club, in Tucumán, the hometown of golfers César Monasterio and Andrés Romero.

Eduardo Romero has won the most titles, with five victories, closely followed by Roberto De Vicenzo and Andrés Romero with four each. The record aggregate score is 258, achieved by Andrés Romero in 2006. In 1991 and 2007 the championship ended in a tie, with no playoff being held to determine an outright winner.

Winners

References

External links
TPG Tour - official site
Jockey Club de Tucumán - official site

Golf tournaments in Argentina